A UML virtual machine may mean:

 a virtual machine that runs UML models
 a User Mode Linux virtual machine